Coleophora xanthoptera is a moth of the family Coleophoridae. It is found in Algeria.

References

xanthoptera
Endemic fauna of Algeria
Moths described in 1952
Moths of Africa